Marmor is a form of marble. It may refer to:

 Marmor, Queensland, a town in Queensland, Australia
 Judd Marmor (1910–2003) American psychiatrist
 Kristian Marmor (born 1987), Estonian footballer
 Marmorie, or Marmor, a warhorse in the French epic The Song of Roland

See also
 Marmora (disambiguation)